Birgham is a village in Berwickshire, parish of Eccles in the Scottish Borders area of Scotland, near Coldstream and the River Tweed, on the A698.                                                  
Birgham is close to Ednam, Kelso, Lempitlaw, Leitholm and Sprouston as well as Carham and Wark on Tweed, Northumberland.

Since mid-December 2015  Birgham has been unofficially twinned with Bedford Falls, the setting for the 1946 film It's a Wonderful Life  even having their road signs amended to include the reference.

See also
Treaty of Birgham
List of places in the Scottish Borders
List of places in Scotland

External links

RCAHMS: Birgham
RCAHMS/Canmore record for Birgham
SCRAN: Roy map of Birgham
Gazetteer for Scotland: Birgham
Birgham Village community website

Villages in the Scottish Borders
Scottish parliamentary locations and buildings